|}

The King's Stand Stakes is a Group 1 flat horse race in Great Britain open to horses aged three years or older. It is run at Ascot over a distance of 5 furlongs (1,006 metres), and it is scheduled to take place each year in June.

History
The event was created as a result of bad weather at Royal Ascot in 1860. Heavy rain made it impossible to run the Royal Stand Plate over its usual distance of 2 miles, so it was shortened to 5 furlongs on the only raceable part of the course. The amended version was called the Queen's Stand Plate, and it subsequently became the most important sprint at the Royal meeting. For a period it was open to horses aged two or older. It was renamed the King's Stand Stakes following the death of Queen Victoria and the accession of King Edward VII in 1901.

The present system of race grading was introduced in 1971, and the King's Stand Stakes was given Group 1 status in 1973. It was downgraded to Group 2 level in 1988.

The King's Stand Stakes became part of a new international race series, the Global Sprint Challenge, in 2005. It consequently featured a number of high-quality contenders from overseas, and it regained Group 1 status in 2008. It is now the fourth leg of the series, preceded by the KrisFlyer International Sprint and followed by the Golden Jubilee Stakes.

The race is currently held on the opening day of the Royal Ascot meeting.

Records
Most successful horse (2 wins):

 Woolsthorpe – 1895, 1897
 Kilcock – 1898, 1899
 Sundridge – 1903, 1904
 Foresight – 1908, 1909
 Hornet's Beauty – 1911, 1913
 Diadem – 1919, 1920
 Golden Boss – 1923, 1924
 Gold Bridge – 1933, 1934
 Elbio – 1991, 1993
 Equiano – 2008, 2010
 Sole Power – 2013, 2014
 Blue Point – 2018, 2019

Leading jockey (7 wins):
 Lester Piggott – Right Boy (1957), Majority Rule (1963), Swing Easy (1971), Abergwaun (1973), Godswalk (1977), Solinus (1978), Never So Bold (1985)

Leading trainer (5 wins):
 Vincent O'Brien – Cassarate (1962), Abergwaun (1973), Godswalk (1977), Solinus (1978), Bluebird (1987)

Leading owner (4 wins):
 Jack Joel – Sundridge (1903, 1904), Nice Prospect (1927), Tag End (1929)

Winners since 1970

Earlier winners

 1860: Queen of the Vale
 1861: Buckstone
 1862: Shillelagh
 1863: Umpire
 1864: Le Bearnais
 1865: Saccharometer
 1866: Hippia
 1867: Cecrops
 1868: Xi
 1869: Gertrude
 1870: King of the Forest
 1871: Chopette
 1872: Bertram
 1873: Prince Charlie
 1874: Blenheim
 1875: Tangible
 1876: Lowlander
 1877: Springfield
 1878: Lollypop
 1879: Hackthorpe
 1880: Charibert
 1881: Ishmael
 1882: Eastern Empress
 1883: Prince William
 1884: Geheimniss
 1885: Glen Albyn
 1886: Financier
 1887: Crowberry
 1888: Noble Chieftain
 1889: Formidable
 1890: Bumptious
 1891: Lady Caroline
 1892: Lady Lena
 1893: Prince Hampton
 1894: Best Man
 1895: Woolsthorpe
 1896: Wishard
 1897: Woolsthorpe
 1898: Kilcock
 1899: Kilcock
 1900: Eager
 1901: Elizabeth M
 1902: Zanoni
 1903: Sundridge
 1904: Sundridge
 1905: Delaunay
 1906: Thrush
 1907: Camp Fire II
 1908: Foresight
 1909: Foresight
 1910: Spanish Prince
 1911: Hornet's Beauty
 1912: Great Surprise
 1913: Hornet's Beauty
 1914: Adular
 1915–18: no race
 1919: Diadem
 1920: Diadem
 1921: Tetratema
 1922: King Sol
 1923: Golden Boss
 1924: Golden Boss
 1925: Diomedes
 1926: Highborn II
 1927: Nice Prospect
 1928: Chichester Cross
 1929: Tag End
 1930: Oak Ridge
 1931: Stingo
 1932: Lemnarchus
 1933: Gold Bridge
 1934: Gold Bridge
 1935: Shalfleet
 1936: Sweet Polly
 1937: Ticca Gari
 1938: Foray
 1939: Mickey the Greek
 1940–45: no race
 1946: Vilmorin
 1947: Greek Justice
 1948: Squander Bug
 1949: Abernant
 1950: Tangle
 1951: Stephen Paul
 1952: Easter Bride
 1953: Fairy Flax
 1954: Golden Lion
 1955: Pappa Fourway
 1956: Palariva
 1957: Right Boy
 1958: Drum Beat
 1959: Chris
 1960: Sound Track
 1961: Silver Tor
 1962: Cassarate
 1963: Majority Rule
 1964: no race
 1965: Goldhill
 1966: Roughlyn
 1967: Be Friendly
 1968: D'Urberville
 1969: Song

See also
 Horse racing in Great Britain
 List of British flat horse races
 Recurring sporting events established in 1860 – this race is included under its original title, Queen's Stand Plate.

References

 Paris-Turf:
 Racing Post:

 galopp-sieger.de – King's Stand Stakes.
 ifhaonline.org – International Federation of Horseracing Authorities – King's Stand Stakes (2019).
 pedigreequery.com – King's Stand Stakes – Ascot.
 

Flat races in Great Britain
Ascot Racecourse
Open sprint category horse races
British Champions Series
1860 establishments in England